
In Māori culture, a rāhui is a form of tapu restricting access to, or use of, an area or resource by the kaitiakitanga of the area. With the passing of the 1996 Fisheries Act, a rāhui was able to be imposed by the New Zealand Ministry of Fisheries, a role that has since been taken over by the Ministry for Primary Industries.  In the Cook Islands, Raui (rahui) have been put in place by the National Environment Service.

Rāhui may be imposed for many reasons, including a need for conservation of food resources or because the area concerned is in a state of tapu, due, for example, to a recent death in the area, out of respect for the dead and to prevent the gathering of food there for a specified period. Rāhui may be placed on land, sea, rivers, forests, gardens, fishing grounds, and other food resources. A rāhui is given its authority by the mana of the person or group that imposes it. (Barlow 1994:104).

Most Rahui are set down in law. For example www.rahui.org.nz details a rahui in place in Maunganui Bay, BOI, and states "Temporary closures in the North Island are established under section 186A of the Fisheries Act 1996 at the request of local tangata whenua. They can be put in place if the closure will improve the availability and/or size of fisheries resources in the area, or recognise a customary fishing practice in that area."

An area may be set aside for a special purpose or function. Trees may be set aside as a carving resource; or flax bushes for the weaving of a special cloak for a chief. Areas may be placed under rāhui requiring them to be left to lie fallow so that the resources may regenerate.

The custom of rāhui is still used today, and it has similarities to the bans imposed by the present day legal system on the gathering of food resources for conservation purposes; however Māori often perceive such bans on the gathering of traditional resources such as shellfish and native birds as 'another denial of their customary rights.'

A sign or physical symbol may be displayed to show that a rāhui has been imposed. Sometimes a carved or decorated wooden stick or post may be placed in the ground. Natural features of the landscape can indicate the boundaries of the area that is under restriction. Additionally, people will be informed about the placing of the rāhui. 

The imposing of rāhui by Māori iwi has no official legal standing, and penalties are not formally imposed upon anyone breaking a rāhui, but it is seen as culturally insensitive to do so.

Notable rāhui

Whakaari/White Island following 2019 volcanic eruption 
Following the volcanic eruption of Whakaari/White Island, in which 20 people were killed, a rāhui was placed on the island restricting access.  It was reported that the rāhui was placed on the island following a ceremony which took place at the mouth of the Whakatane River at 4am on Tuesday 10 December 2019.  The Buttle family, who have owned the island for over 80 years, asked that the rāhui be respected. The rāhui was lifted on Saturday 28 December.

Mataharehare Pa site, Parnell, Auckland City 
A rāhui was placed on the site by Ngāti Whātua-o-Ōrākei and Tainui elders in March 2021, shortly before construction work on a controversial National Erebus memorial was scheduled to start. This rāhui carries unusual significance given its application is deemed primarily a political act.

References

Further reading
C. Barlow (1994). Tikanga Whakaaro: Key Concepts in Māori Culture. Reprint with corrections. First published 1991. Auckland:Oxford.

Māori words and phrases
Māori culture
Māori society
Māori religion
Māori science